The Chairman of the Supreme Soviet of the Kirghiz Soviet Socialist Republic (from December 15, 1990: the Kyrgyz Republic) was the parliamentary speaker of that unicameral legislature. It was succeeded by a bicameral legislature 1995-2007.

Chairmen of the Supreme Soviet

Sources

Europa World Year Book 2 (2004)

Political history of Kyrgyzstan
Lists of legislative speakers in the Soviet Union
Politics of the Soviet Union
List
List